All Because of You may refer to:

 All Because of You (film) or Pasal Kau!, a 2020 Malaysian romantic comedy film

Albums 
 All Because of You (Daryle Singletary album) (1996)
 All Because of You (Lisa Whelchel album) (1984)
 All Because of You, a 1994 album by Lisa Bevill

Songs 
 "All Because of You" (Marques Houston song) (2005)
 "All Because of You" (U2 song) (2005)
 "All Because of You" (Puffy song) (2008)
 "All Because of You", by Geordie from Hope You Like It (1973)
 "All Because of You", by Barry White from Just Another Way to Say I Love You (1975)
 "All Because of You", by Karen Carpenter from Karen Carpenter (1996)
 "All Because of You", by Blackmore's Night from Fires at Midnight (2001)
 "All Because of You", by Celine Dion from A New Day Has Come (2002)
 "All Because of You", by Saliva from Back into Your System (2002)
 "All Because of You", by Sunrise Avenue from On the Way to Wonderland (2006)
 "All Because of You", by Julia Volkova (2011)

See also
 Because of You (disambiguation)